Ahoskie  is a town in Hertford County, North Carolina, United States. The population was 5,039 at the 2010 census.  Ahoskie is located in North Carolina's Inner Banks region. Its nickname is "The Only One" because no other town in the world is known by the same name. The etymology of the word Ahoskie, which was originally spelled "Ahotsky," was from the Wyanoke Indians, who entered the Hertford County area at the beginning of European settlement.

History
Ahoskie began as a railroad siding for log trains hauling timber from the forests of Bertie and Hertford counties to a sawmill at Tunis on the Chowan and Southern Railroad line beginning in 1885. The town grew out of a loading station and commissaries to supply the community workers who cut, hauled and loaded the logs. Ahoskie’s post office was established in 1889. The first passenger train passed through town on the newly opened tracks of the Norfolk and Carolina line in 1890.  

By the time of its incorporation on January 24, 1893, Ahoskie had grown to include several stores, a saw mill and gin, a one-room school and a Baptist church. Other industries that flourished in the town’s early days included an ice plant, a laundry operated by a wandering Chinese man, and a number of horse and mule exchanges and sales stables. Since few of the smaller towns in Hertford and Bertie counties were located on passenger lines, traveling salesman or “drummers” would use the town as a base to make sales trips to outlying community stores by horse and buggy.

The town’s first bank, the Bank of Ahoskie, was chartered in 1905.

This area's economy was initially based on the cultivation of tobacco and cotton. It has continued to be largely rural with small towns. 

The town has both historic districts and individual buildings listed on the National Register of Historic Places: the Ahoskie Historic District, Ahoskie Downtown Historic District, and East End Historic District; and Ahoskie School, Roberts H. Jernigan House, King-Casper-Ward-Bazemore House, William Mitchell House, Mulberry Grove, and James Newsome House. The town has highlighted these resources to encourage heritage tourism.

The county gave an acre of land on which the first Black school in Ahoskie was built, three years after the Civil War. The one-room schoolhouse at Hayes Street and Catherine Creek Road remained about 35 years. The first teacher at the school was Van Butler, and the school term was four months.

Through years of untiring efforts by the Black community, by 1939 the Ahoskie Graded School consisted of two brick buildings, with fourteen elementary teachers, five high school teachers and an enrollment of some 800 boys and girls.

The first Black church, The New Ahoskie Baptist Church, was organized in 1866.  Other early churches in the Black community were The Methodist Church and Calvary Baptist Church.

The first charity organized in the Black community was Love and Charity, a mutual help group that met in members’ homes under the slogan “Love to All, True to each Other, Mercy to all Mankind.” Other early organizations included the Elks, Masons and Tents. The United Order of the Queens of the Orient had its origins in Ahoskie in 1923.

By 1939, the town had grown to include a number of Black-owned businesses including five grocery stores, three barber shops, three cafes, a dry goods store, a millinery shop, three hairdressers, three seamstresses, a doctor, a stenographer, two funeral homes and a garage.  The Atlantic District Fair Association represented the economic interests of the town’s Black community.

Perhaps the largest show seen in the town was a visit by Buffalo Bill’s Wild West Show in October 1916, an event that drew an estimated 12,000 people and required three shows to accommodate everybody. The leading citizens of the town hosted a breakfast at The Manhattan hotel for Col. William F. Cody, who expressed his deep appreciation for the hospitality accorded to him. Cody’s visit came about through the personal solicitation of a kinsman of the show’s business manager. 

Electric lights were first turned on in Ahoskie around Christmas in 1915. The power was generated by a gasoline engine and within two years was providing electricity day and night. 

Ahoskie was the first stop in North Carolina for first lady Ladybird Johnson during her whistle-stop tour of the South aboard the Lady Bird Express, on Oct. 6, 1964.

Geography
Ahoskie is located at  (36.286439, -76.986436).

According to the United States Census Bureau, the town has a total area of 4.35 square miles, all land.

Demographics

2020 census

As of the 2020 United States census, there were 4,891 people, 1,895 households, and 1,044 families residing in the town.

2010 census
As of the census of 2010, there were 5,039 people, 2,062 households, and 1,263 families residing in the town. The population density was 1,169 inhabitants per square mile. There were 2,309 housing units at an average density of 536 per square mile. The racial makeup of the town was 66.6% African American, 28.5% White, 1.50% Native American, 1.3% Asian, and 1.1% from two or more races. Hispanic or Latino of any race were 1.6% of the population.

There were 2,062 households, out of which 20.9% had children under the age of 18, 43.0% were married couples living together, 25.2% had a female householder with no husband present, and 31.8% were non-families. The average household size was 2.35 and the average family size was 3.01.

The population ages were distributed with 28.1% under the age of 20, 5.7% from 20 to 24, 22.3% from 25 to 44, 24.3% from 45 to 64, and 19.7% who were 65 years of age or older. The median age was 39.5 years.

The median income for a household in the town was $28,438, and the median income for a family was $37,833. Males had a median income of $36,711 versus $27,398 for females. The per capita income for the town was $17,648. About 19.8% of families and 26.4% of the population were below the poverty line, including 36.8% of those under age 18 and 22.4% of those age 65 or over.

Business and college 
Ahoskie is home to the Roanoke-Chowan News-Herald newspaper.
In nearby Cofield there is a steel rolling mill owned and operated by Nucor Steel.
Roanoke-Chowan Community College is located just outside Ahoskie in Union.

In the late 1990s, the town of Ahoskie donated a former elementary school to the Shaw University, based in Raleigh. It established a C.A.P.E. centers, to help improve and enhance the vocational and educational skills of individuals in lower-class communities in the surrounding area.

Notable people

 Kentwan Balmer, defensive end in the NFL
 Edward L. Fike (1920-2011), journalist and publisher in California, Montana, North Carolina, Ohio, and Virginia.
 Bobby Futrell, cornerback in the NFL for the Tampa Bay Buccaneers from 1986-1990
 Sam Harrell, running back in the NFL for the Minnesota Vikings
 Robert Lee Holloman, Democratic member of the North Carolina General Assembly representing the state's fourth Senate district
 Jason Horton, former NFL, CFL and Arena Football League cornerback
 Howard J. Hunter Jr., Democratic member of the North Carolina General Assembly representing the state's fifth House district
 Toran James, former NFL, XFL and Arena Football League fullback/linebacker
 Dick Newsome, pitcher for the Boston Red Sox
 Timmy Newsome, fullback in the NFL for the Dallas Cowboys from 1980-1988
 Amber O'Neal, professional wrestler
 J. Mayon Parker (1901-1977), newspaperman, co-publisher of the Hertford County Herald, coined the nickname "Demon Deacons" to describe the 1923 Wake Forest Baptists football team
 J. Roy Parker Sr. (1895-1957), newspaperman, co-publisher of the Hertford County Herald, NC Press Association president 1933-34, UNC School of Journalism professor, elected to NC House in 1956
 Roy Parker Jr. (1930-2013), newspaperman, founding editor of The Fayetteville Times, 1999 North Carolina Journalism Hall of Fame inductee, 2006 recipient of the North Carolina Award 
 Lori J. Pierce, American radiation oncologist, 57th President - American Society of Clinical Oncology 
 Graham Smith, Tuskegee Airman
 Robert Lee Vann, newspaper publisher and editor
 Tom Umphlett, MLB player for the Boston Red Sox and Washington Senators
 Oshane Ximines, outside linebacker in the NFL for the New York Giants

References

External links
 Official website

Towns in North Carolina
Towns in Hertford County, North Carolina